Lake St. George Caves Ecological Reserve is an ecological reserve located west of Lake Winnipeg, Manitoba, Canada. It was established in 1997 under the Manitoba Ecological Reserves Act.

See also
 List of ecological reserves in Manitoba
 List of protected areas of Manitoba

References

External links
 Lake St. George Caves Ecological Reserve, Backgrounder
 iNaturalist: Lake St. George Caves Ecological Reserve

Protected areas established in 1997
Ecological reserves of Manitoba
Nature reserves in Manitoba
Protected areas of Manitoba